was the 10th head of the Tayasu branch of the Tokugawa clan. The son of Tokugawa Satotaka, he was a graduate of Tokyo Imperial University's engineering college.

He held the rank of captain in the Imperial Japanese Navy prior to World War II, and subsequently worked for K. Hattori.

Family
 Father: Tokugawa Satotaka
 Mother: Shimazu Tomoko
 Wife: Todo Motoko
 Children:
 Munefusa Tokugawa by Motoko
 Masako married Tokugawa Yoshiyasu of Owari-Tokugawa Family by Motoko
 Tokugawa Munemasa (1930-1999) by Motoko
 Tokugawa Munehiro by Motoko
 Sumiko married Hitoguchi Michiobu by Motoko
 Matsudaira Munetoshi (b.1940) by Motoko

References

1899 births
1961 deaths
University of Tokyo alumni
Imperial Japanese Navy officers
Tokugawa clan
Kazoku